United States national Australian rules football team may refer to:

 United States men's national Australian rules football team
 United States women's national Australian rules football team